That's All is a solo album by pianist Tete Montoliu recorded in 1971 and released on the Danish label, SteepleChase in 1985.

Reception

Scott Yanow of AllMusic said "Montoliu's style has Bud Powell's bop approach as its foundation but also incorporates the more modern chord voicings of McCoy Tyner and Bill Evans. This album is a fine example of his talents".

Track listing
 "You Go to My Head" (J. Fred Coots, Haven Gillespie) – 5:11
 "When I Fall in Love" (Victor Young, Edward Heyman) – 2:34
 "'Round About Midnight" (Thelonious Monk) – 5:35
 "A Child Is Born" (Thad Jones) – 5:13
 "Giant Steps" (John Coltrane) – 4:12
 "Imagination" (Jimmy Van Heusen, Johnny Burke) – 5:22
 "That's All" (Alan Brandt, Bob Haymes) – 4:49
 "Solar" (Miles Davis) – 4:07

Personnel
Tete Montoliu – piano

References

Tete Montoliu albums
1985 albums
SteepleChase Records albums
Solo piano jazz albums